The Arxivers sense Fronteres (English: Archivists without Borders) (est. 1998) is an organization of archivists headquartered in Barcelona, Spain. It facilitates volunteer efforts to preserve documentary heritage, especially in developing countries.

Associated organizations
The group coordinates with branch organizations in other countries, such as: 
 Archiveros Sin Fronteras Chile (est. 2012)
 Archivistes sans Frontières, France (est. 2005)

References

Bibliography

External links

 Official site
 Student Chapter of the Society of American Archivists at Simmons College, United States. Archivists without Borders blog posts.
 AsF Djibouti (in French)
 AsF Haiti (in French)

Organizations established in 1998
1998 establishments in Spain
Organisations based in Barcelona
Archivist associations
International volunteer organizations
History organisations based in Spain